Víctor Cabedo Carda (15 June 1989 – 19 September 2012) was a Spanish professional road racing cyclist. He died following a collision with a vehicle while on a training ride.

In 2012 he rode his only grand tour, the Giro d'Italia. Cabedo finished 129th overall helping teammate Mikel Nieve to 10th place in the overall standings.

Major results
Sources:
2006
 1st Stage 3b Vuelta al Besaya
2007
 National Junior Road Championships
2nd Time trial
 1st  Overall Vuelta al Besaya
1st  Points classification
1st Stages 2 & 4a (ITT)
 6th Overall Tour du Pays de Vaud
2011
 1st Stage 5 Vuelta a Asturias
 5th Klasika Primavera

References

External links 

1989 births
2012 deaths
Spanish male cyclists
People from Plana Baixa
Sportspeople from the Province of Castellón
Cycling road incident deaths
Road incident deaths in Spain
Cyclists from the Valencian Community